Raya Zeineddine (born 8 March 1988) is a Syrian sports shooter. She competed in the Women's 10 metre air rifle event at the 2012 Summer Olympics.

References

External links
 Profile at London2012.com
 Profile at BBC Sport Olympics 2012
 Profile at ISSF
 Profile at www.NBColympics.com

1988 births
Living people
Syrian female sport shooters
Olympic shooters of Syria
Shooters at the 2012 Summer Olympics
People from as-Suwayda
Shooters at the 2006 Asian Games
Shooters at the 2010 Asian Games
Asian Games competitors for Syria